Florian Lucchini (born 13 February 1981 in Perpignan) is a French retired footballer who played as a goalkeeper.

Career
Lucchini started his career in Stade Rennais youth academy before joining Corsican sides GFCO Ajaccio and AC Ajaccio. In 2007, he played for six months in Ionikos FC and signed with Vihren for a free transfer in July 2008.

Vihren
Lucchini made his official debut for Vihren in a match against Levski Sofia on 9 August 2008. He played for 90 minutes. The match ended in a 1:0 win for Vihren.
He made a phenomenal contribution to Vihren in the Bulgarian first division game against Levski and Sandanski fans named him The crazy Corsican. The Bulgarian variation of this name is Лудият корсиканец. In the 58th minute Lucchini saved a penalty kick.

References

1981 births
Living people
French footballers
Association football goalkeepers
Expatriate footballers in Cyprus
Ionikos F.C. players
AEP Paphos FC players
AC Ajaccio players
OFC Vihren Sandanski players
PFC Lokomotiv Plovdiv players
Panserraikos F.C. players
Ligue 1 players
First Professional Football League (Bulgaria) players
Cypriot First Division players
French expatriate footballers
Expatriate footballers in Bulgaria
French expatriate sportspeople in Bulgaria
Expatriate footballers in Greece
French expatriate sportspeople in Greece
Sportspeople from Perpignan
Footballers from Occitania (administrative region)